The Parker Hale M85 is a British bolt-action .308 sniper rifle, with an effective range around 900 metres. It fires from a 10-round detachable magazine, and weighs 12 pounds, telescopic sight included. The rifle was created after the Falklands War by Parker Hale Ltd in response to shortcomings in the contemporary Lee–Enfield L42A1. Although the Parker Hale M85 manufacturing licence was sold to Gibbs Rifle Co., it has not yet resumed production.

History
The M85 took part in a British Army trial to see if it could be used as a potential sniper rifle, along with the Accuracy International PM, Heckler & Koch PSG1, SIG Sauer SSG 2000, and Remington 700. The rifle lost by a slight margin to the Accuracy International (adopted by the British Army as the L96).

Design
The M85's range is about 600 metres and has an 85% first round hit capabilities from 600 – 900 metres. The weapon also has a silent safety catch, a threaded muzzle for a flash suppressor, and an integral dovetail rail that accepts a variety of sights. The standard telescopic sight is a 6×42mm Schmidt & Bender with a BDC from 200 – 900 meters. Emergency iron sights are also fitted. The rifle is outfitted with a bipod as standard. The fiberglass stock is made by McMillan.

Variants
There is a police variant of the M85, which has a cheek pad option on the rifle's timber stock.   This was marketed as the M87 model.

Users
 : Brazilian Navy (GRUMEC)  (Batalhão de Operações Especias de Fuzileiros Navais)
 : Royal Malaysian Navy (PASKAL)

References

External links
 

Bolt-action rifles of the United Kingdom
Sniper rifles of the United Kingdom
7.62×51mm NATO rifles